Michael Shulman is a Tony Award winning American film, stage, television actor and producer. Shulman is the recent founder of Sand & Snow Entertainment, a company formed in 2021, dedicated to artist-driven work that stirs conversation, especially in younger generations. Previously, he was the co-owner of New York and Los Angeles-based production company Starry Night Entertainment alongside Craig Saavedra.  Shulman received a Bachelor of Arts degree from Yale University with a major in art history.

Early life
Born in New York City, Shulman has been acting since childhood where he began his career in theatre and quickly appeared in more than 10 plays and musicals, including a two-year run on Broadway in Les Misérables, the original cast of Stephen Sondheim's Assassins, and two plays by John Guare. He was a member of the cast of Recess, and played the role of the Hustler Kid. It was during this time that he began his recording career and has since appeared in more than five albums. Shulman next turned to television and film and landed several roles, including Jodie Foster's Little Man Tate, M. Night Shyamalan's Wide Awake, Disney's Can of Worms, Fox's Party of Five (1994), and his acclaimed performance as Benny in the HBO special, Someone Had to Be Benny (1996) for which he was nominated for a CableAce Award (the youngest nominee in the Award's history) and won a Daytime Emmy Award.

Career
In 2009 Shulman produced and starred in the comedy/drama Sherman's Way opposite James LeGros Enrico Colantoni, Brooke Nevin, Donna Murphy, Lacey Chabert.  Reviews of the movie cited “Shulman has puppyish good looks and a talent for both slapstick and exasperation. He ably conveys this character's remoteness from the real world, handling self-deprecating, sardonic asides with skill.”

In 2010–2014, Shulman appeared in TV shows ranging from Law & Order, Unforgettable, the feature film The Word Atlantic Theater Company's White People by J. T. Rogers while also producing the New York premiere of “”Mistakes Were Made”” at Barrow Street Theatre with Academy Awards nominated actor Michael Shannon.  In 2014, Shulman and Saavedra's production arm Starry Night Entertainment earned its first two Tony Award nominations as producers on Broadway's After Midnight (musical) and The Cripple of Inishmaan starring Daniel Radcliffe.

2015–2018
Shulman and Saavedra expanded their theatrical slate both on Broadway and The West End with an innovative Wall Street investing model deployed in shows including Tony Award winning Hedwig and the Angry Inch both on Broadway and on National Tour, The Elephant Man with Bradley Cooper, Photograph 51 starring Nicole Kidman on the West End, Les Liaisons Dangereuses (play) starring Liev Schreiber and Labour of Love starring Martin Freeman.

2018–2019
Shulman and Saavedra opened the West End premiere of John Logan's Red and The Lieutenant of Inishmore by Martin McDonagh.

Later that year, the team produced the Broadway transfer of The Ferryman.

The play won the 2019 Tony Award for Best Play.

2020 and beyond 
With theater shuttered due to the pandemic, Shulman expanded into screen, with several projects on the near horizon. Through his new Sand & Snow venture, he has committed to redoubling his efforts to support artists across all mediums tell authentic and passionate stories.

Continuing his support of Director Sam Mendes, Shulman is a producer of the Tony-nominated play The Lehman Trilogy

The play won the 2022 Tony Award, Shulman’s second. 

Through Sand and Snow Entertainment, Shulman is currently producing the play ORLANDO on the West End starring Emma Corrin.

Awards
 Tony Award for The Lehman Trilogy - Best Play 2021-2022 Broadway Season
 Tony Award for The Ferryman - Best Play 2018–2019 Broadway Season
 Daytime Emmy Award
 CableAce Award

Personal life 
A passionate supporter of the arts, Shulman serves on the board of the Young Partners at The Public Theater as well as volunteers for Meet Me at MoMA a special access program for people with dementia. He has also spoken of his affiliation with The Aspen Institute.

References

External links

Michael Shulman Official Website
Starry Night Entertainment
Sand & Snow Entertainment Official Website

1981 births
Living people
Male actors from New York City
Daytime Emmy Award winners